The 2004 DFB-Pokal Final decided the winner of the 2003–04 DFB-Pokal, the 61st season of Germany's premier knockout football cup competition. It was played on 29 May 2004 at the Olympiastadion in Berlin. Werder Bremen won the match 3–2 against second-division Alemannia Aachen, giving them their 5th cup title.

Route to the final
The DFB-Pokal began with 64 teams in a single-elimination knockout cup competition. There were a total of five rounds leading up to the final. Teams were drawn against each other, and the winner after 90 minutes would advance. If still tied, 30 minutes of extra time was played. If the score was still level, a penalty shoot-out was used to determine the winner.

Note: In all results below, the score of the finalist is given first (H: home; A: away).

Match

Details

References

External links
 Match report at kicker.de 
 Match report at WorldFootball.net
 Match report at Fussballdaten.de 

SV Werder Bremen matches
Alemannia Aachen matches
2003–04 in German football cups
2004
May 2004 sports events in Europe
2004 in Berlin
Football competitions in Berlin